The Neretvan nase or Dalmatian nase, (Chondrostoma knerii) is a species of freshwater fish in the family Cyprinidae. It is found in Bosnia and Herzegovina and Croatia.

It is threatened by habitat loss and pollution.

References

Chondrostoma
Freshwater fish of Europe
Fish described in 1843
Taxonomy articles created by Polbot
Endemic fauna of the Balkans
Endemic fish of the Neretva basin
Species endangered by river-damming
Fish of Bosnia and Herzegovina